Coateswood, also known as the Job Johnstone House, is a historic home located at Newberry, Newberry County, South Carolina, USA. It was built in 1841 and is a gabled roof, brick and frame, Greek Revival style house. It was originally three stories; the third floor was removed and the roof lowered about 1940. The front facade has two monumental Roman Doric order columns that support a gabled portico and a second floor porch. Also on the property are a contributing garage, well house, and a building referred to as the Long House.

It was listed on the National Register of Historic Places in 1975.

References

Houses on the National Register of Historic Places in South Carolina
Greek Revival houses in South Carolina
Houses completed in 1841
Houses in Newberry County, South Carolina
National Register of Historic Places in Newberry County, South Carolina